Cassagnes is the name or part of the name of the following communes in France:

Cassagnes, Lot, in the Lot department
Cassagnes, Pyrénées-Orientales, in the Pyrénées-Orientales department
Cassagnes-Bégonhès, in the Aveyron department

People with the surname
André Cassagnes (1926–2013), French inventor
Louis Victorin Cassagne (1774–1841), French general of the Napoleonic Wars